Ethan Cha is an American politician serving in the Minnesota House of Representatives since 2023. A member of the Minnesota Democratic-Farmer-Labor Party (DFL), Cha represents District 47B in the southeast Twin Cities metropolitan area, which includes the city of Woodbury and parts of Washington County in Minnesota.

Minnesota House of Representatives 
Cha was first elected to the Minnesota House of Representatives in 2022, following redistricting and the retirement of DFL incumbents Steve Sandell and Tou Xiong. He sits on the Agriculture Finance and Policy, Commerce Finance and Policy, Housing Finance and Policy, and Legacy Finance Committees.

Electoral history

Personal life 
Cha lives in Woodbury, Minnesota and has three children.

References

External links 

Living people
Democratic Party members of the Minnesota House of Representatives
21st-century American politicians
People from Woodbury, Minnesota